Ksenia Palkina ( or Ksenia Palkina Ulukan; born 13 December 1989) is a Russian-born Kyrgyzstani former tennis player. Palkina won 11 singles titles and 27 doubles titles on the ITF Women's Circuit. On 23 March 2009, she reached her career-high singles ranking of world No. 163. On 12 April 2010, she peaked at No. 164 in the WTA doubles rankings.

Personal life
Palkina was born in Khabarovsk Krai to mother Marina and father Nikolay, and has a brother named Nikita. Her favourite surface is clay.

As of November 2019, Palkina has been provisionally suspended by the Tennis Integrity Unit.

ITF Circuit finals

Singles: 17 (11 titles, 6 runner-ups)

Doubles: 52 (27 titles, 25 runner-ups)

References

External links
 
 

1989 births
Living people
People from Komsomolsk-on-Amur
Sportspeople from Bishkek
Russian emigrants to Kyrgyzstan
Kyrgyzstani people of Russian descent
Kyrgyzstani female tennis players
Tennis players at the 2010 Asian Games
Tennis players at the 2014 Asian Games
Tennis players at the 2018 Asian Games
Asian Games competitors for Kyrgyzstan
Match fixing in tennis
Expatriate sportspeople in Italy